Stiphodon atratus, the black stiphodon, is a species of goby found on in Indonesia, along the northern coast of New Guinea, in the Admiralty Islands, by Halmahera Island, the Bismark Archipelago, around Bougainville, Vanuatu and New Caledonia.
  
This species can reach a length of  SL.

References

atratus
Taxa named by Ronald E. Watson
Fish described in 1996
Fish of Indonesia
Fish of New Guinea
Fauna of Halmahera
Fauna of Vanuatu
Fish of New Caledonia